Alice Elinor Lambert (1886–1981) was an American romance writer.

Biography
Lambert was born in Corvallis, Oregon in 1886. Her father, Charles Edward Lambert, was born in Ireland in 1843. He came to the United States prior to the Civil War and enlisted to be a Union Soldier. After the war, he became a missionary. In 1876, he married Ella Amelia Northrup in Lafayette, Indiana. Her father, Samuel Lathrop, was the first Methodist missionary bishop in Montana. After living and teaching in Indiana, they moved to Salem, Oregon where he was the president of Willamette University. In 1886 he became a Congregational minister in Yaquina City, Oregon. There were six other children in the family with Alice being the middle child. In 1896, they moved to Tacoma, Washington and later to Seattle, Washington.

In 1904, she enjoyed a brief summer romance with Canadian landscape painter Tom Thomson. Thomson was quiet, but Lambert would later write, "We knew without words that we loved each other. We had ESP, hardly needing words, and I know he felt the same towards me." Despite this, she laughingly rejected his marriage proposal.

Lambert later became a writer; in her 1934 self-published novel, Woman Are Like That, she describes a young girl who refuses an artist's proposal and later regrets her decision. Specifically, the main character, Miss Juliet Delany, remembers, 

Reports conflict about whether or not Lambert ever married. David Silcox and Harold Town wrote that she never married, while Roy MacGregor wrote that she married a man and had two daughters with him.

She died in Marysville, Washington in 1981 at the age of 95.

References

Citations

Bibliography

 
 
 
 
 
 
 

1886 births
1981 deaths
20th-century American novelists
American romantic fiction writers
American women novelists
Women romantic fiction writers
20th-century American women writers